Vanduzeeina is a genus of shield-backed bugs in the family Scutelleridae. There are about five described species in Vanduzeeina.

Species
These five species belong to the genus Vanduzeeina:
 Vanduzeeina balli (Van Duzee, 1904)
 Vanduzeeina borealis Van Duzee, 1925
 Vanduzeeina californica Van Duzee, 1925
 Vanduzeeina senescens Usinger, 1930
 Vanduzeeina slevini Usinger, 1930

References

Further reading

 
 
 

Scutelleridae
Articles created by Qbugbot